Thong Saen Khan is a district (amphoe) in the southern part of Uttaradit province, northern Thailand.

Geography
Neighboring districts are (from the southwest clockwise) Phichai, Tron, Mueang Uttaradit, Tha Pla, Nam Pat of Uttaradit Province,  Chat Trakan and Wat Bot of Phitsanulok province

History
The minor district (king amphoe) was created on 1 July 1983, when four tambon were split off from Tron district. It was upgraded to a full district on 21 May 1990.

Administration
The district is divided into four sub-districts (tambons), which are further subdivided into 45 villages (mubans). The township (thesaban tambon) Thong Saen Khan covers parts of tambon Bo Thong. There are a further four tambon administrative organizations (TAO).

References

External links
amphoe.com

Thong Saen Khan